"Gangsta Luv" is the lead single from Snoop Dogg's tenth studio album, Malice n Wonderland. It was produced by Tricky Stewart and co-produced by The-Dream, who is also featured in the song.  It was released digitally on October 6, 2009, as the first official single of Malice n Wonderland after the promo single "Snoop Dogg Millionaire".

Music video
The music video (directed by Paul Hunter) premiered on October 21, 2009.  DJ Felli Fel makes a cameo appearance in the video. The video was introduced on 106 & Park on October 30, 2009, during a special Halloween episode. The music video shows The-Dream driving a blue Cadillac Low-Rider, and Snoop Dogg sitting in the back. Throughout the video, the appearance of Snoop Dogg, The-Dream and the girls around them change as the car travels through different places. The way the car appears to drive through various locations (including impossible indoor locations such as a women's locker room) is very similar to the opening-credits sequences of The Naked Gun films.

The video ranked at #66 on BET's Notarized: Top 100 Videos of 2009 countdown.

Track listing
Digital single

Commercial performance
On the week ending November 7, 2009, "Gangsta Luv" debuted on the Billboard Hot 100 at #57. The following week, it fell to #60, but it came back up to #55 in its third week. On the week ending December 17, 2009, it broke into the Top 40 at #35.

Charts

Weekly charts

Year-end charts

References

2009 singles
Snoop Dogg songs
The-Dream songs
Music videos directed by Paul Hunter (director)
Songs written by The-Dream
Songs written by Snoop Dogg
Songs written by Tricky Stewart
Song recordings produced by Tricky Stewart
2009 songs